Trujui is a city in Buenos Aires Province, Argentina. It is the second largest city in Moreno Partido.

, the population was 98,649.

References

External links

Populated places in Buenos Aires Province
Populated places established in 1942
Moreno Partido
Cities in Argentina
1942 establishments in Argentina